Aztec High School in Yuma, Arizona was a school for at-risk and juvenile probation students on the site of the Yuma County Juvenile Court. It was founded in 1994 and moved to its current campus site in 2001. In the 2007–2008 school year, it served 100 students, 60 of whom were on juvenile probation. 16 students graduated, and 10 went on to colleges or universities.

See also
Alternative school

References

External links
 
 Yuma County information on Aztec HS

Public high schools in Arizona
Alternative schools in the United States
Buildings and structures in Yuma, Arizona
Schools in Yuma County, Arizona